The rainbow jersey is the distinctive jersey worn by the reigning world champion in a cycling discipline, since 1927. The jersey is predominantly white with five horizontal bands in the UCI colours around the chest. From the bottom up the colours are: green, yellow, black, red and blue; the same colours that appear in the rings on the Olympic flag. The tradition is applied to all disciplines, including road racing, track racing, cyclo-cross, BMX, Trials and the disciplines within mountain biking. 
A world champion must wear the jersey when competing in the same discipline, category and speciality for which the title was won. For example, the world road race champion would wear the garment while competing in stage races (except for time trial stages) and one-day races, but would not be entitled to wear it during time trials. Similarly, on the track, the world individual pursuit champion would only wear the jersey when competing in other individual pursuit events.
In team events, such as the team pursuit, each member of the team must wear the rainbow jersey, but would not wear it while racing in, say, points races or other track disciplines.  If the holder of a rainbow jersey becomes leader of a stage race or a category within it, that leadership jersey takes precedence.  Failure to wear the rainbow jersey where required carries a penalty of a fine.

After the end of a rider's time as champion, they are eligible to wear piping in the same rainbow pattern on the collar and cuffs of their jersey for the remainder of their career.

Reigning world champions
The reigning world champions (elite only) are as follows:

Curse of the rainbow jersey
The curse of the rainbow jersey is a popular term to refer to the phenomenon where cyclists who have become World Champion often suffer from poor luck the next year – though, in some cases, the 'bad luck' was brought on by their own actions.

In 2015 an article by epidemiologist Thomas Perneger examining the curse was published in The BMJ. The study was based on statistical analysis of the results of World Road Champions and winners of the Giro di Lombardia (which was used as a comparison) in the riders' winning seasons and for the two years afterwards (to enable comparison of results before, during and after the supposed curse was in effect). The patterns of data were compared to four statistical models: the "spotlight effect", based on the theory that the apparent curse is due to increased public attention on the World Champion rather than a decline in success; the "marked man" hypothesis, which stipulates that the current wearer of the jersey is more closely marked by rivals during their year as champion; the "regression to the mean" model, which supposes that random variation in success rates will mean that a highly successful season for a rider is likely to be followed by less successful years; and a model combining the last two theories. The study found that the regression to the mean model was the one that fit the data best, for winners of both the World Championship and Il Lombardia, concluding that the curse probably does not exist. The author related the idea of the curse to medical professionals conflating correlation with causation when considering the effect of treatment on a patient.

Designs
In the past, each discipline had its own variation of the jersey. Since the 2016 Cyclo-cross Worlds, the 'classic' jersey without symbols (previously reserved for the road race and paracycling road race) was assigned to all disciplines.

Other sports
Rainbow jersey colors have been used unofficially by triathlon, speed skating and Crashed Ice world champions.

See also

UEC European Champion jersey
Union Cycliste Internationale

Notes and references

Sports-related curses

Cycling jerseys
Road bicycle racing terminology
1927 clothing